Les Débuts du modèle (The Model's Début or The Model's First Session) is a c.1770 oil-on-canvas painting by Jean-Honoré Fragonard, acquired by Édouard André before his marriage and now in the Musée Jacquemart-André.

References

Paintings by Jean-Honoré Fragonard
1770 paintings
Paintings in the collection of the Musée Jacquemart-André